Kołobrzeg Lighthouse (Polish: Latarnia morska Kołobrzeg) is a lighthouse in Kołobrzeg on the Polish coast of the Baltic Sea. The lighthouse in located in Kołobrzeg, West Pomeranian Voivodeship; in Poland.

The lighthouse is located in between the lighthouse in Niechorze (about 34 km to the west) and the lighthouse in Gąski (22 km to the east).

History 
The lighthouse is located at the entrance to the port of Kołobrzeg, it stands on the right bank of the river Parsęta. The history of the Kołobrzeg Lighthouse dates back to 1666. In World War II the lighthouse was blown up by German engineers as it was a good look-out point for the Polish artillery in March 1945. After the Second World War the lighthouse was built at a slightly different location from the original, using the foundations of the fort buildings complex; located close by to the town. The lighthouse is 26 metres tall, with a range of its light glare of 29.6 kilometres. In 1981 the lighthouse was renovated and the 50 cm diameter lens was replaced by a rotating set of halogen bulbs. The wooden staircase was also replaced by a metal one. The base of the lighthouse houses a mineral rock museum.

Technical data 
 Light characteristic
 Light: 1 s.
 Darkness: 2 s.
 Period: 3 s.

See also 

 List of lighthouses in Poland

References

External links 

 Urząd Morski w Słupsku  
 Latarnia morska (Kołobrzeg) na portalu polska-org.pl

Lighthouses completed in 1945
Resort architecture in Pomerania
Lighthouses in Poland
Tourist attractions in West Pomeranian Voivodeship
1666 establishments in the Holy Roman Empire